The gens Atia, sometimes written Attia, was a plebeian family at Rome.  The first of the gens to achieve prominence was Lucius Atius, a military tribune in 178 BC. Several of the Atii served in the Civil War between Caesar and Pompeius.  The gens Attia may be identical with this family, although the individuals known by that name lived nearly a century after the more notable Atii, and are not known to have been related.

Origin
The gens does not appear to have been of any great antiquity, and none of its members ever attained the consulship; but, since Augustus was connected with it on his mother's side, the flattery of the poets derived its origin from Atys, the friend of Ascanius, the son of Aeneas.

Praenomina
The Atii are known to have used several of the most common praenomina at Rome, including Lucius, Marcus, Gaius, Publius, and Quintus.

Branches and cognomina
The cognomina of the Atii are Balbus, Rufus, and Varus.  The Atii Balbi were from the city of Aricia.  The Venetian scholar Paulus Manutius conjectured that the family of the Labieni belonged to the Atia gens, which opinion has been followed by most modern writers.  However, Spanheim pointed out that there was no authority for this.  As Labienus is not found as the cognomen of any person named Atius, nor in any other gens, it is probably the nomen of a separate gens.

Members

 Lucius Atius, the first tribune of the second legion in the war with the Istri, in 178 BC.
 Quintus Atius Varus, commander of the cavalry under Gaius Fabius, one of Caesar's legates in Gaul, and probably the same Quintus Varus who served under Caesar during the Civil War.
 Gaius Atius, a partisan of Gnaeus Pompeius, who had possession of Sulmo, but surrendered to Caesar when the populace opened the gates to forces under Marcus Antonius, in 49 BC.
 Publius Attius Varus, a zealous partisan of Pompeius during the Civil War, fell at the Battle of Munda.
 Atius Rufus, one of the officers in Pompeius' army in Greece, in 48 BC, accused Lucius Afranius of treachery on account of his defeat in Hispania in the preceding year.

Atii Balbi
 Marcus Atius Balbus, father of the praetor of 62 BC.
 Marcus Atius M. f. Balbus, praetor in 62 BC, grandfather of Augustus.
 Atia M. f. M. n., possible elder aunt of emperor Augustus.
 Atia M. f. M. n., the second wife of Gaius Octavius, and mother of Augustus.
 Atia M. f. M. n., the aunt of Augustus, and wife of Lucius Marcius Philippus, consul in 38 BC.
 Marcus Atius M. f. M. n. Balbus, proconsul of Sardinia in 38 BC. Probably maternal uncle of emperor Augustus.
 Atia M. f. M. n., possible mother of the consuls Gaius Junius Silanus and Marcus Junius Silanus. Possibly cousin of Augustus.

See also
 Attia gens
 List of Roman gentes

References

 
Roman gentes